Nicklas is a given name and surname. Notable people with the name include the following:

Given name

Sports

Football
Nicklas Bärkroth (born 1992), Swedish footballer
Nicklas Bergh (born 1982), Swedish footballer
Nicklas Carlsson (born 1979), Swedish footballer 
Nicklas Dannevang (born 1990), Danish footballer
Nicklas Bendtner (born 1988), Danish footballer
Nicklas Halse (born 1997), Danish footballer
Nicklas Helenius (born 1991), Danish footballer
Nicklas Højlund (born 1990), Danish footballer 
Nicklas Strunck (born 1999), Danish footballer
Nicklas Maripuu (born 1992), Swedish footballer
Nicklas Mouritsen (born 1995), Danish footballer
Nicklas Pedersen (born 1987), Danish footballer
Nicklas Shipnoski (born 1998), German footballer
Nicklas Svendsen (born 1986), Danish footballer

Hockey
Nicklas Bäckström (born 1987) Swedish ice hockey player
Nicklas Dahlberg (born 1985), Swedish ice hockey
Nicklas Danielsson (born 1984), Swedish ice hockey player
Nicklas Grossmann (born 1985), Swedish ice hockey player
Nicklas Heinerö (born 1991), Swedish ice hockey player
Nicklas Jadeland (born 1986), Swedish ice hockey player
Nicklas Jensen (born 1993), Danish ice hockey player
Nicklas Johansson (born 1984), Swedish ice hockey player
Nicklas Lasu (born 1989), Swedish ice hockey player
Nicklas Lidström (born 1970), Swedish ice hockey player
Nicklas Strid (born 1994), Swedish ice hockey player

Racing
Nicklas Cajback (born 1986), Swedish motorcycle racer
Nicklas Nielsen (born 1997), Danish racing driver
Nicklas Porsing (born 1993), Danish speedway rider

Tennis
Nicklas Kulti (born 1971), Swedish tennis player
Nicklas Utgren (born 1969), Swedish tennis player

Other sports
Nicklas Holm (born 1981), Danish sailor
Nicklas Mathiasen (born 1991), Danish badminton player
Nicklas Wiberg (born 1985), Swedish decathlete

Other fields
Nicklas Barker (born 1969), Swedish musician
Nicklas Nygren (born 1983), Swedish video game developer
Nicklas Pedersen (Mister World) (born 1990), Danish carpenter, model and male pageant winner
Nicklas Söderblom (born 1968), Swedish personal trainer, actor, and author

Middle name
Karl Nicklas Gustavsson (1972), Swedish composer

Surname
Charlie Nicklas (born 1930), English footballer
Danny Nicklas (born 1991), English rugby league footballer
William H. Nicklas (1866–1960), American architect

See also

Nickolas
Niclas
Niklas (name)
Nicklaus (surname)

Masculine given names